Climate change in Georgia encompasses the effects of climate change, attributed to man-made increases in atmospheric carbon dioxide, in the U.S. state of Georgia.

Studies show that Georgia is among a string of "Deep South" states that will experience the worst effects of climate change, with effects including "more severe floods and drought", and higher water levels "eroding beaches, submerging low lands, and exacerbating coastal flooding".

The United States Environmental Protection Agency states: "In the coming decades, Georgia will become warmer, and the state will probably experience more severe floods and drought. Even today, more rain is falling in heavy downpours, and sea level is rising about one inch every decade. ... Like other southeastern states, Georgia has warmed less than most of the nation during the last century. But during the next few decades, the changing climate is likely to harm livestock, increase the number of unpleasantly hot days, and increase the risk of heat stroke and other heat-related illnesses".

Environmental impacts

Rising sea levels

"Sea level is rising more rapidly in Georgia than along most coasts because the land is sinking. If the oceans and atmosphere continue to warm, sea level is likely to rise one to four feet in the next century along the coast of Georgia. Rising sea level submerges wetlands and dry land, erodes beaches, and exacerbates coastal flooding".

Water resources, flooding, and drought

"Changing the climate is likely to increase the severity of both inland flooding and droughts. Since 1958, the amount of precipitation falling during heavy rainstorms has increased by 27 percent in the Southeast, and the trend toward increasingly heavy rainstorms is likely to continue. Rising temperatures are likely to increase the demand for water but make it less available. Warmer temperatures increase the rate at which water evaporates (or transpires) into the air from soils, plants, and surface waters. Because irrigated farmland would need more water, the total demand for water is likely to increase 10 to 50 percent during the next half century. But the amount of available water is likely to decrease, and soils are likely to become drier in most of the state, except along the coast".

"As temperatures rise, less water is likely to flow into the Chattahoochee and other major rivers. Decreased river flows can lower the water level in Lake Lanier and other reservoirs, which may limit municipal water supplies for Atlanta and other cities. Lower water levels may also impair ecosystems, swimming, and other recreational activities, and reduce hydroelectric power generation".

Economic and social impacts

Agriculture and forest resources

"Changing the climate will have both harmful and beneficial effects on farming. Although hotter temperatures alone would tend to depress crop yields, higher concentrations of atmospheric carbon dioxide increase yields, and that fertilizing effect is likely to offset the harmful effects of heat on cotton, peanuts, soybeans, and wheat—if adequate water is available. More severe droughts, however, could cause crop failures. Higher temperatures are likely to reduce livestock productivity, because heat stress disrupts the animals' metabolism".

"Warmer temperatures and changes in rainfall are unlikely to substantially reduce forest cover in Georgia, although the composition of trees in the forests may change. More droughts would reduce forest productivity, and climate change is also likely to increase the damage from insects and disease. But longer growing seasons and increased carbon dioxide concentrations could more than offset the losses from those factors. Forests cover about half of the state, with oak-pine forests common in the north, loblolly-shortleaf pine forests common in the center, and longleaf-slash pine forests common in the south. Changing the climate may enable oak-pine forests to become the most common forest type throughout the state".

Coastal storms, homes, and infrastructure

"Tropical storms and hurricanes have become more intense during the past 20 years. Although warming oceans provide energy, scientists are not sure whether the recent intensification reflects a long-term trend. Nevertheless, hurricane wind speeds and rainfall rates are likely to increase as the climate continues to warm".

"Whether or not storms become more intense, coastal homes and infrastructure will flood more often as sea level rises, because storm surges will become higher as well. Rising sea level is likely to increase flood insurance rates, while more frequent storms could increase the deductible for wind damage in homeowner insurance policies. Parts of Savannah and Brunswick are vulnerable to coastal flooding, which is likely to become more severe as sea level rises".

See also
 List of U.S. states and territories by carbon dioxide emissions
 Plug-in electric vehicles in Georgia (U.S. state)

References

Further reading
 —this chapter of the National Climate Assessment covers Southeast states (Virginia, West Virginia, North Carolina, South Carolina, Florida, Georgia, Alabama, Tennessee, Arkansas, Louisiana).

Georgia
Climate of Georgia (U.S. state)